The Lower Mississippi River is the portion of the Mississippi River downstream of Cairo, Illinois.  From the confluence of the Ohio River and Upper Mississippi River at Cairo, the Lower flows just under 1000 miles (1600 km) to the Gulf of Mexico.  It is the most heavily travelled component of the Mississippi River System.

Structures 
Unlike on the upper rivers, there are no locks or dams on the Lower Mississippi.  The river is, however, constrained by levees and dikes to control flooding and secure a navigation channel for barges.  The Old River Control Structure, the Bonnet Carré Spillway, the Mississippi River – Gulf Outlet Canal and other man-made structures on the lower reaches of the river seek to manipulate the flow of water in the vicinity of New Orleans.

History 
The political and engineering focus in the 20th century was to separate the Lower Mississippi River from its floodplain.  Levees and channelization—along with substantial loss of bottomland forests to agriculture in the alluvial valley—have resulted in a loss of wildlife and fish habitat, decreased water quality, and an expansion of the hypoxic zone in the Gulf of Mexico.  Agricultural runoff has resulted in increased turbidity, siltation, pollution from pesticides, toxicity to aquatic organisms, oxygen depletion and eutrophication.

Navigation
Channel depth of 9 feet is maintained by the Corps of Engineers from St. Louis, Missouri to Baton Rouge, Louisiana.

On the lower Mississippi, from Baton Rouge to the Gulf, the navigation depth is 45 feet, allowing for container ships and cruise ships to dock at the Port of New Orleans and bulk cargo ships shorter than 150 foot air draft to fit under the Huey P. Long Bridge and traverse the Mississippi to Baton Rouge. There is a feasibility study to dredge this portion of the river to 50 feet to allow New Panamax ship depths.

See also
 List of crossings of the Lower Mississippi River
 2011 Mississippi River floods
 Upper Mississippi River

References

Freshwater ecoregions
Ecoregions of the United States